Notable alumni of the University of Idaho College of Law.

Federal Judges

U.S. Circuit Judges
Blaine Anderson, class of 1949, United States Court of Appeals for the Ninth Circuit (1976–88), District Court Judge for the District of Idaho (1971–76)
Danielle J. Forrest, class of 2004, United States Court of Appeals for the Ninth Circuit (2019–present)
Thomas Nelson, class of 1962 (LL.B.), United States Court of Appeals for the Ninth Circuit (1990–2003), senior judge (2003–11)

U.S. District Judges
Ed Lodge, class of 1961 (LL.B), District of Idaho (1989–2015), senior judge (2015–2019), Bankruptcy Judge (1988-1989)
Ray McNichols, class of 1950 (LL.B), District of Idaho (1964–85), senior judge (1981-85)
Harold Ryan, class of 1950 (LL.B), District of Idaho (1981–92), senior judge (1992-95)
Fred Taylor, class of 1926 (LL.B), District of Idaho (1954–71), senior judge (1971–1988)

U.S. Magistrate Judges
Candy Dale, class of 1982, District of Idaho (2008–2022)
Mikel H. Williams, class of 1969, District of Idaho (1984–2008)

Bankruptcy Judge
Noah G. Hillen, class of 2007, District of Idaho (2020–present)
Terry L. Myers, class of 1980, District of Idaho (1998–2020)
Jim D. Pappas, class of 1977, District of Idaho (1990–present)

State Judges

Supreme Court Justices
 Stephen Bistline, class of 1949, Idaho Supreme Court (1976–94)
 Larry Boyle, class of 1972, Idaho Supreme Court (1989–92), U.S. Magistrate Judge (1992–2008)
 Roger Burdick, class of 1974, Idaho Supreme Court (2003–21); Chief Justice (2011–15, 2017–20)
 Joel Horton, class of 1985, Idaho Supreme Court (2007–18)
 Robert Huntley, class of 1959, Idaho Supreme Court (1982–89)
 Dan Eismann, class of 1976, Idaho Supreme Court (2001–17); Chief Justice (2007–11)
 Wayne Kidwell, class of 1964, Idaho Supreme Court (1999–2004), Attorney General of Idaho (1975–79)
 Charles McDevitt, class of 1956, Idaho Supreme Court (1989–97); Chief Justice (1993–97)
 John Stegner, class of 1982, Idaho Supreme Court (2018–present)
 Linda Copple Trout, class of 1977, Idaho Supreme Court (1992–2007); Chief Justice (1997–2004)
 Jesse Walters, class of 1963, Idaho Supreme Court (1997–2003), judge on the Idaho Court of Appeals (1982–97)
 Colleen Zahn, class of 2000, Idaho Supreme Court (2021–present)

Court of Appeals Judges
 Amanda Brailsford, Class of 1993, Idaho Court of Appeals (2019-present)
 David Gratton, Idaho Court of Appeals (2009-present)
 Michael P. Gibbons, Nevada Court of Appeals (2015–present)
 Molly Huskey, class of 1993, Idaho Court of Appeals (2015–present)
 John Melanson, class of 1981, Idaho Court of Appeals (2009–17)
 Darrell Perry, class of 1976, Idaho Court of Appeals (1993–2009)
 Roger Swanstrom, class of 1956 (LL.B), Idaho Court of Appeals (1982–93)

Politicians

Executive Branch

Governors
 Jim Risch, class of 1968, Governor of Idaho (2006–07), U.S. Senator (2009–present), Lieutenant Governor of Idaho (2003–06, 2007–09)

Lieutenant Governors
 David Leroy, class of 1971, Lieutenant Governor of Idaho (1983–87), Idaho Attorney General (1979–83)

Attorneys General
 Tony Park, class of 1963, Idaho Attorney General (1971–75)
 Bob Robson, class of 194x (LL.B), Idaho Attorney General (1969–71)
 Lawrence Wasden, class of 1985, Idaho Attorney General (2003–23)

United States Attorney
 Bart Davis, class of 1980, United States Attorney for Idaho (2017–21)
 Thomas E. Moss, United States Attorney for Idaho (2001-2010)

Other Executive Branch officials
 Dave Bieter, class of 1986, Mayor of Boise (2004–2020)
 Hamer Budge, class of 1936, chairman of the Securities and Exchange Commission (1969–71), U.S. Representative from 2nd district (1951–61)
 Abe Goff, class of 1924 (LL.B), commissioner on the Interstate Commerce Commission, U.S. Representative from 1st district (1947–49)

Legislative Branch

United States Senator
 Jim McClure, class of 1950 (LL.B.), United States Senator from Idaho (1973–91), United States Representative from Idaho's 1st congressional district (1967–73)
 Herman Welker, class of 1929 (LL.B), United States Senator from Idaho (1951–57)

United States House of Representatives
 Bill Sali, class of 1984, United States Representative from Idaho's 1st congressional district (2007–09)

Business Leaders
 Frank Shrontz, class of 1954 (LL.B), chairman and chief executive officer of Boeing

Academia

References

University of Idaho
University of Idaho alumni